Rychnov u Jablonce nad Nisou is a town in Jablonec nad Nisou District in the Liberec Region of the Czech Republic. It has about 2,800 inhabitants.

Administrative parts
The village of Pelíkovice is an administrative part of Rychnov u Jablonce nad Nisou.

Geography
The northern part of the municipal territory with the town proper lies in the western tip of the Giant Mountains Foothills. The Mohelka River flows through the town.

History

The first written mention of Rychnov is from 1361. It was probably founded by Cistercians from Mnichovo Hradiště in the 13th century.

In 1856, the railway was built. It helped to the development of the region, from which Rychnov also benefited.

During the German occupation of Czechoslovakia in 1944–1945, the Germans operated a subcamp of the Gross-Rosen concentration camp, whose prisoners were hundreds of men, mostly Poles, but also Czechs, the French, etc.

Sights
Church of Saint Wenceslaus is the most valuable building in Rychnov u Jablonce nad Nisou. The original wooden church building was as old as the town. The current church was built in the early Baroque style in 1704–1712.

There is a town museum with expositions of concentration camp and local paintings.

References

External links

Cities and towns in the Czech Republic
Populated places in Jablonec nad Nisou District